Murd-e Susani (also Romanized as Mūrd-e Sūsanī; also known as Mowrsūsanī) is a village in Qarah Chaman Rural District, Arzhan District, Shiraz County, Fars Province, Iran. At the 2006 census, its population was 47, in 12 families.

References 

Populated places in Shiraz County